Bernd Schneider may refer to:
Bernd Schneider (racing driver) (born 1964), German racecar driver
Bernd Schneider (footballer) (born 1973), German football player
Bernd Schneider, founder of Vacu Vin, Netherlands